Elbert is a name that derived from the Germanic Alibert and may refer to:

People

Given name
 Elbert Andrews (1901–1979), American baseball player
 Elbert Adrain Brinckerhoff (1838–1913), American merchant and mayor 
 Egbert B. Brown (1816–1902), American Civil War Union general
 Elbert Crawford (1966–2013), American football player
 Elbert Dijkgraaf (born 1970), Dutch economist and politician
 Elbert Allen Drummond (1943–2012), American heir, businessman and philanthropist
 Elbert Guillory (born 1944), Louisiana politician
 Elbert de Leeuw (1519/20–1598), Dutch jurist and statesman better known as Elbertus Leoninus
 Elbert Peets (1886–1968), American landscape architect, city planner
 Elbert Roest (born 1954), Dutch politician and historian
 Elbert Root (1915–1983), American Olympic diver
 Elbert A. Smith (1871–1959), American Latter Day Saints leader
 Elbert B. Smith (1921–2013), American historian and author
 Elbert H. Smith (fl. 1839), American poet
 Elbert S. Smith (1911–1983), American politician
 Elbert D. Thomas (1883–1953), United States Senator for Utah
 Elbert Lee Trinkle (1876–1939), American Governor of Virginia
 Elbert Tuttle (1897–1996), American judge
 Elbert Weinberg (1928–1991), American sculptor
 Elbert West (1967–2015), American country singer-songwriter
 Elbert A. Woodward (1836–1905), American fraudster

Surname
Andor Elbert (1934–2014), Hungarian-born Canadian sprint canoer 
Donnie Elbert (1936–1989), American soul singer and songwriter
Emily Elbert (born 1988), American singer-songwriter and guitarist
Samuel Elbert (1740–1788), American merchant, revolutionary soldier, and politician
Samuel Hitt Elbert (1833–1899), American governor and chief justice of Colorado
Samuel Hoyt Elbert (1907–1997), American linguist

Places in the United States
 Elbert, Colorado, named for Samuel Elbert (1833–1899)
 Elbert County, Colorado, named for Samuel Elbert (1833–1899)
 Elbert County, Georgia, named for Samuel Elbert (1740–1788)
 Elbert, Texas
 Elbert, West Virginia
 Lake Elbert, Florida
 Mount Elbert, the highest mountain in the Rocky Mountains; named for Samuel Elbert (1833–1899)

Other
 Elbert meteorite, a meteorite which fell in Colorado in 1998

Dutch masculine given names
English masculine given names